Siddhantha Shikhamani is a religious scripture of the Panchacharyas tradition of Veerashaivas .Traditionally it is attributed to Shri Shivayogi Shivacharya. It is regarded as Dharmagrantha ("sacred scripture") of Veerashaivism. The work is in the form of a dialogue between Jagadguru Renuka and Agastya Maharshi. This work is also known by other names: Renukagastya samvada and Veerashiava Mahatantra.

About the Author

Shri Shivayogi Shivacharya is believed to be an incarnation of Renukacharya. He belongs to early 8th century. Scholars are not conclusive about it.

History
Traditionally, Siddhantha Shikhamani is attributed to Sri Shivayogi Shivacharya, and is said to contain the preachings of Jagaduru Renukacharya, the first Panchacharya. According to the work (see chapter 3), Shivacharya was a member of the gana of Shiva. Due to his error, he was sent to earth to be born as a human being, as a punishment. It was written in Sanskrit, and gives an elaboration of "the primitive traits of Veerashaivism [found] in the Vedas and the Upanishads" and "the concrete features given to it in the latter parts (Uttarabhaga) of the Saivagamas."

Translations
 Kannada language: by 1008 Jagaduru sri Dr. Chandrashekhara Shivacharya Mahaswamiji of Jangamawadi math of Varanasi (21st century).
 English: by M. Shivakumara Swamy from Bengaluru in 2007, with the blessings of 1008 Jagadguru Sri. Chandrashekara Shivacharya Mahaswamiji, Varanasi.

Contents
According to M. Sivakumara Swamy, "The doctrine of one hundred and one Sthalas is the central teaching of the text. This doctrine is developed in the form of a dialogue between Sri Renuka, one of the five holy Acharyas (Panchacharyas) of yore who founded Virasaivism, and Agastya, the pitcher-born sage of Pancavati."

This work has 21 chapters. The introduction (ch. 1–5) starts with a prayer to Shiva, the supreme lord. The introduction further states that Veerashaiva philosophy is equivalent to the Vedas and all knowledge of Upanishads and Agamas (Ch.3, Sl.71, SN.139), and narrates how Panchacharya Shree Jagadguru Renukacharya sprang from Someshwara Linga at Kolipaki (ch. 3 and 4), who transmitted the Veerashaiva philosophy to Sage Agasthya (ch.5), to be written down by Shivayogi Shivacharya (ch.1).

Chapter 5: This gives a detailed description of Shatsthala.

References

Further reading
 Guru S. Bale, Siddantha Sikamani (in English), Asha-Sid Publishing Company

External links
 Veerashaiva Directory website
 Shri Siddhantha Shikhamani: Sanskrit-Kannada
 Shri Siddhantha Shikhamani: Sanskrit-English
 Sanskrit text in Karnata lipi/script, with Suprabhodini Tiku in Kannada
 List of chapters

Hindu texts
Veerashaiva